Shinichi Katoh (加藤 伸一, born July 19, 1965 in Kurayoshi, Tottori, Japan) is a former Nippon Professional Baseball pitcher.

External links

1965 births
Living people
Baseball people from Tottori Prefecture
Japanese baseball players
Nippon Professional Baseball pitchers
Nankai Hawks players
Fukuoka Daiei Hawks players
Hiroshima Toyo Carp players
Orix BlueWave players
Osaka Kintetsu Buffaloes players
Japanese baseball coaches
Nippon Professional Baseball coaches